Lumpaci the Vagabond may refer to:
 Lumpaci the Vagabond (1936 film), a German / Austrian film
 Lumpaci the Vagabond (1922 film), a German silent film